The Yeovil Show is an agricultural show held at the Yeovil Showground, Yeovil, Somerset, England.

History
The show was last held in 1966.

The show made a comeback in the summer of 2016 after a break of 50 years. The event was organised by the Yeovil Agricultural Society, and reopened during a weekend in July 2016. After running for three years, the show was cancelled in 2019 due to the sale of Aldon Park (now part of Yeovil Country Park).

Showground 
The Yeovil Showground is used for events throughout the year.

References

External links

Agricultural shows in England
Yeovil
Events in Somerset
Economy of Somerset